Claquebue Island is a rocky island  long, lying  east of Dru Rock in the Curzon Islands. It was charted in 1951 by the French Antarctic Expedition and named by them, for the village in La Jument Verte, a novel much read and appreciated by members of the French expedition.

See also 
 List of Antarctic and sub-Antarctic islands

References 

Islands of Adélie Land